USS Cayuga County (LST-529) was an  built for the United States Navy during World War II. Named for Cayuga County, New York.

LST-529 was laid down on 8 November 1943 at Jeffersonville, Indiana by the Jeffersonville Boat & Machine Company; launched on 17 January 1944; sponsored by Mrs. Margaret S. Carey; and commissioned on 29 February 1944.

Service history
During World War II, LST-529 was assigned to the European Theater and participated in the Invasion of Normandy in June 1944. On 7 June 1946, she was decommissioned and, as a result of hostilities in Korea, recommissioned on 22 September 1950. She served in the Korean War and took part in the following campaigns: U.N. Summer-Fall offensive (July and August 1951); the Second  Korean Winter (December 1951 through March 1952); and the Korea, Summer 1953 (June and July 1953). Immediately following the Korean War, she continued to serve in the Korean area until July 1954. Following her Korean service, she returned to the United States.

She was named USS Cayuga County (LST-529) on 1 July 1955 and was assigned as a logistic support ship for the Mariana and Bonin Islands in the late 1950s, remaining there until decommissioned and transferred to the Republic of Vietnam on 17 December 1963, when she was renamed Thi Nai (HQ-502). Following the fall of Saigon on 29 April 1975 Thi Nai escaped to the Philippines. Transferred to the Philippine Navy 17 November 1975 she was renamed BPR Cotabato Del Sur (LT-87). The ship was scrapped in 2003.

LST-529 earned one battle star for World War II service and three battle stars for Korean War service.

References

See also
 List of United States Navy LSTs

LST-491-class tank landing ships
World War II amphibious warfare vessels of the United States
Korean War amphibious warfare vessels of the United States
Cold War amphibious warfare vessels of the United States
Cayuga County, New York
Ships built in Jeffersonville, Indiana
Ships transferred from the United States Navy to the Republic of Vietnam Navy
1944 ships